Maria Rita Guarino (born 31 January 1971) is an Italian professional football manager and former player who is the manager of Italian club Inter Women. As a player, she represented the Italy national team as a striker.

Playing career
Throughout her career she played as a striker for Juventus, Torino, Reggiana, Fiammamonza, Torres, Lazio and Foroni Verona in Serie A, and Maryland Pride in the W-League.

She was a member of the Italian national team, and took part in the 1991 and 1999 World Cups, and the 1993, 1997 and 2001 European Championships. She scored Italy's last goal in the 1991 World Cup, forcing the extra time in the quarterfinals against Norway. She again scored a goal against Norway in the 2001 Euro.

Managerial career

Italy youth 
Since 2015, Guarino has served as Italy's under-17 national team's assistant manager and Manager of Football – Individual Training System.

Juventus 
On 16 June 2017, Guarino was appointed head coach of Juventus Women. She led the team to their first ever Scudetto: both Juventus and Brescia finished the season tied at 60 points atop the League thus making a tie-breaker necessary. On 20 May 2018 in Novara Juventus beat Brescia 5–4 at penalty shoot-out winning the championship following their debut season in the league.

In 2018–19 they won their second consecutive league title and their first Coppa Italia. The following season, Juventus won their first Supercoppa Italiana and their third consecutive league title. In 2020–21, Juventus won their second Supercoppa Italiana and their fourth consecutive league title, making a perfect season with 22 victories out 22.

Inter Milan 
On 21 May 2021, Guarino announced that she would leave Juventus at end of the season. On 17 June 2021, Guarino was appointed head coach of Inter Women.

Personal life 
In 2017, she co-authored the book Train in women's football. Technical, tactical, physical aspects and estimates.

Career statistics

Managerial

Honours

Manager 
Juventus
 Serie A: 2017–18, 2018–19, 2019–20, 2020–21
 Coppa Italia: 2018–19
 Supercoppa Italiana: 2019, 2020

Publications

References

External links
 

1971 births
Living people
Italian women's footballers
Italy women's international footballers
Expatriate women's soccer players in the United States
Juventus F.C. (women) managers
Inter Milan (women) managers
Torres Calcio Femminile players
Serie A (women's football) players
S.S. Lazio Women 2015 players
USL W-League (1995–2015) players
Italian expatriate women's footballers
1991 FIFA Women's World Cup players
1999 FIFA Women's World Cup players
Footballers from Turin
Women's association football forwards
A.S.D. Reggiana Calcio Femminile players
Italian football managers
Serie A (women's football) managers
ASD Fiammamonza 1970 players
Torino Women A.S.D. players
ASDF Juventus Torino players
Foroni Verona F.C. players
Italian expatriate sportspeople in the United States